Freddie is an American television sitcom created by Conrad Jackson, Freddie Prinze Jr., Bruce Rasmussen and Bruce Helford. The series first premiered on ABC on October 12, 2005 and was quickly canceled on May 31, 2006. Freddie is inspired by Prinze Jr.'s real life, growing up in a house filled with women. His lifelong friend, Conrad Jackson, co-created this series with Prinze, along with executive producers Bruce Helford and Bruce Rasmussen.

Cast
 Freddie Prinze Jr. as Freddie Moreno
 Brian Austin Green as Chris
 Jacqueline Obradors as Sofia Moreno
 Chloe Suazo as Zoey Moreno
 Mädchen Amick as Allison
 Jenny Gago as Grandma

Notable crossovers
Freddie Prinze Jr., Brian Austin Green, and Chloe Bridges all play their characters respectively on the American sitcom, George Lopez (Episode: George Gets Cross Over Freddie). Chloe Bridges is credited as Chloe Suazo.

Production
Freddie was co-produced by Hunga Rican and Excitable Boy! in association with and Mohawk Productions and Warner Bros. Television. The friendship between Freddie and Chris in the show was loosely based on Jackson and Freddie's real-life friendship. It was reported by Variety on May 12, 2006, that ABC had decided not to renew the series, which was confirmed on May 15, 2006. The show aired in reruns on Sí TV in the United States and on Trouble in the United Kingdom until the channels closed.

Reception

Critical
The show received a largely negative critical reception, with review aggregator Metacritic awarding the show 33 out of 100 based on 24 reviews.

Tim Goodman of the San Francisco Chronicle called the show "stupid" and "annoying," along with fellow ABC sitcom Hot Properties.

Ratings

Episodes

References

External links

 

2000s American sitcoms
2005 American television series debuts
2006 American television series endings
American Broadcasting Company original programming
English-language television shows
Hispanic and Latino American television
Television series by Mohawk Productions
Television series by Warner Bros. Television Studios
Television series created by Bruce Helford
Television shows filmed in Los Angeles
Television shows set in Chicago
Latino sitcoms